$1 coin may refer to:
 Australian one-dollar coin
 Loonie, the Canadian $1 coin
 New Zealand dollar coin
 Dollar coin (United States)